Kosmos 2133 ( meaning Cosmos 2133) is a Russian US-KMO missile early warning satellite which was launched in 1991 as part of the Russian Space Forces' Oko programme. The satellite is designed to identify missile launches using infrared telescopes.

Kosmos 2133 was launched from Site 200/39 at Baikonur Cosmodrome in Kazakhstan. A Proton-K carrier rocket with a DM-2 upper stage was used to perform the launch, which took place at 08:31 UTC on 14 February 1991. The launch successfully placed the satellite into geostationary orbit. It subsequently received its Kosmos designation, and the international designator 1991-010A. The United States Space Command assigned it the Satellite Catalog Number 21111.

Kosmos 2133 was the first satellite in the US-KMO series and was operational for over 4 years.

See also

List of Kosmos satellites (2001–2250)

References

Spacecraft launched in 1991
Spacecraft launched by Proton rockets
Kosmos satellites
Oko
1991 in the Soviet Union